The Independent Institute is an American libertarian think tank based in Oakland, California. Founded in 1986 by David J. Theroux, the institute focuses on political, social, economic, legal, environmental, and foreign policy issues. It has more than 140 research fellows. The institute was originally established in San Francisco, was re-located in 1989 to Oakland, and since 2006 has had an office in Washington, D.C. The institute is organized into seven centers addressing a range of issues. According to the 2020 Global Go To Think Tank Index Report (Think Tanks and Civil Societies Program, University of Pennsylvania), the institute is ranked number 42 (of 110) in the "Top Think Tanks in the United States".

Publications and programs
Since 1996, the institute has published the quarterly scholarly journal The Independent Review, whose founding editor and editor at large is the economist and historian Robert Higgs, and co-editors are Christopher Coyne, Michael Munger, and Robert Whaples.

The institute conducts various conference programs. The institute's Independent Policy Forum has included seminars by individuals including James M. Buchanan and Gore Vidal.

Its program in criminal justice sponsored a series of televised debates on PBS-TV, Stopping Violent Crime: New Directions for Reduction and Prevention, moderated by Harvard law professor Arthur R. Miller, former U.S. Attorney General Richard Thornburgh, federal judge David Sentelle, civil libertarian writer Wendy Kaminer, and others.

In 2006, the institute opened an office in Washington and expanded its media program, including a weekly column by Senior Fellow Álvaro Vargas Llosa in the Washington Post. In 2006 the institute released an Open Letter on Immigration.

Policy areas

The institute's stated mission is "to boldly advance peaceful, prosperous, and free societies, grounded in a commitment to human worth and dignity." 

The institute maintains MyGovCost.org, which focuses on the critical analysis of fiscal policy and government waste. It includes a calculator described as enabling Americans to estimate their lifetime federal tax liability and the hypothetical alternative investment return.

Independent Institute scholars have criticized the Patient Protection and Affordable Care Act on economic, legal, ethical, and privacy grounds.

Independent Institute scholars have leveled several criticisms of Medicare. Senior Fellow John R. Graham has lamented the widespread indifference to the Medicare Trustees report's warnings of Medicare's mounting fiscal problems. He has, however, defended Medicare Advantage for giving seniors more choices than traditional Medicare. John C. Goodman has argued that healthcare inflation in the United States began with the creation of Medicare. To help curb Medicare spending, Graham has proposed incentivizing enrollees to seek less expensive medical treatment abroad. Craig Eyermann has also proposed giving Medicare enrollees a direct economic stake in lowering the costs. Goodman has called for the privatization of Medicare.

The Independent Institute has criticized the U.S. Food and Drug Administration, for what it sees as over-regulation as a result of political and bureaucratic incentives. Independent's website FDAReview.org cites numerous scholarly studies by academic economists that question the agency's safety, effectiveness, and incentives. Senior Fellow Robert Higgs has argued that the FDA's regulation of healthcare products is “hazardous to our health”.

Senior Fellow Alexander Tabarrok has questioned the need for the FDA's pre-approval requirements for pharmaceuticals on the grounds that doctors successfully prescribe many drugs for off-label usage.

Civil liberties and human rights

Independent Institute fellows have written on a variety of topics related to civil liberties and human rights. Historian Jonathan Bean anthologized and annotated numerous historical speeches, letters, and articles that show individualist perspectives that animated the American civil-rights era in his book Race and Liberty in America: The Essential Reader. Since 2012, Bean has served on the Illinois State Advisory Committee, a federally appointed panel that advises the U.S. Commission on Civil Rights, and his experience led him to claim that the mainstream civil rights community was out of touch with the public's civil rights concerns.

Second Amendment legal scholar Stephen Halbrook, who has won three firearms cases before the U.S. Supreme Court, has argued in several Independent Institute books and articles that civil liberties are more secure when individuals have legal access to firearms. His 2003 book, The Founders’ Second Amendment, traced the U.S. Constitution's guarantees of “the right of the people to keep and bear Arms” back to the American colonists’ fears of British oppression. His 2013 book, Gun Control in the Third Reich, examined firearm registration and restrictions in pre-World War II Germany.

Economists Christopher Coyne and Abigail Hall have argued that interventionist militarism can lead to a “boomerang effect,” setting in motion political, institutional and ideological forces that contribute to the suppression of civil liberties in the aggressive country.

Independent has also criticized major aspects of the criminal justice system as antagonistic toward civil liberties. Senior Fellow Bruce L. Benson argued in The Enterprise of Law that before the British crown took over the courts, the legal system focused on restitution for victims, rather than punishment, corrections, and deterrence.

In The Power of Habeas Corpus in America, winner of a 2013 PROSE Award in the category of Law and Legal Studies, Research Fellow Anthony Gregory put forth a revisionist view of the writ of habeas corpus, arguing that rather than always promoting the cause of civil liberties, the legal idea has served “both as an engine and a curb on state power.”

Criticism of the U.S. invasion of Afghanistan

In the aftermath of September 11 attacks, the Independent Institute was an early advocate of using privateers, (rather than a military invasion of Afghanistan) to bring the co-conspirators of the terrorist attacks to justice under international law, as authorized in Article I, Section 8, clause 11 of the United States Constitution.

Opposition to the Iraq War

The Independent Institute promotes a U.S. foreign policy of free trade and non-interventionism, and this perspective was apparent in a host of publications and events it sponsored during the wars in Iraq and Afghanistan since 2001.

Even before the United States led the 2003 airstrikes on Iraq, the Independent Institute's fellows and speakers voiced opposition to a U.S.-Iraq War. That opposition continued for the duration of the conflict. In a Reason magazine symposium marking the 10th anniversary of war's inception, Research Fellow Anthony Gregory called the Iraq war “the worst U.S. government project in my lifetime,” and Senior Fellow Robert Higgs said the sizable political and material benefits that accrued to the war's architects demonstrate that “Crime pays.”

Senior Fellow Ivan Eland, who directs Independent's Center on Peace and Liberty, wrote extensively on the Iraq war and told an audience at the 2013 CPAC conference that the war helped illustrate why the America's Founders warned against foreign entanglements and were suspicious of standing armies. He has also argued that conservatives who seek a more limited government should celebrate Calvin Coolidge instead of the more interventionist Ronald Reagan.

Eland has argued that the best strategy for minimizing sectarian strife in post-Saddam Iraq is for Iraqis to peacefully partition their country along ethnic and religious lines, a view once also supported by then-Senator Joe Biden and former Ambassador Peter Galbraith.

Climate change
The Independent Institute has published works by atmospheric physicist and professor emeritus of environmental science Fred Singer, who is an advocate of climate change attribution denial and impact denial. The works include Hot Talk, Cold Science: Climate Change's Unfinished Debate in 1999. It was co-authored with Frederick Seitz, another research fellow of the institute. The book included Singer's 2004 essay, "The Scientific Case against the Global Climate Treaty". The institute also published a 2003 policy report, "New Perspectives in Climate Change: What the EPA Isn't Telling Us", also by Singer. That report criticized the EPA's 2001 Climate Action Report.

Funding

For the fiscal year ending June 30, 2014, the institute had total revenue of $2,775,869.  From 2007 to 2011 the institute took in $12,249,065 from gifts, grants, contributions, and membership fees; and $536,747 in gross income from interest, dividends, payments received on securities loans, rents, royalties, and income from similar sources.

Microsoft funding controversy
On June 2, 1999, the institute sponsored a full-page advertisement titled Open Letter on Antitrust Protectionism in the Washington Post and the New York Times. The ads were signed by 240 economists and claimed "headline-grabbing cases against Microsoft, Intel, Cisco Systems, Visa and MasterCard, along with a flurry of merger investigations now underway, would appear to demonstrate the need for a vigorously enforced antitrust policy that will create checks and balances to eliminate consumer harm. However, consumers did not ask for these antitrust actions—rival business firms did."

In September 1999, a controversy arose when New York Times reporter Joel Brinkley stated that the advertisements had been paid for by  Microsoft. Based on internal Independent Institute documents "provided to the New York Times by a Microsoft adversary associated with the computer industry who refused to be further identified", Brinkley wrote that Microsoft "has secretly served as the institute's largest outside financial benefactor in the last year." Independent Institute internal documents showed that Microsoft had contributed $203,217 in 1999, making it the single largest contributor. Brinkley calculated that Microsoft's contribution amounted to approximately 20% of the funds in 1999 from external sources, excluding $304,725 contributed by Theroux.

The day after Brinkley's article appeared, Theroux stated that "our final year-end records do not agree with the numbers he had been provided by his source" and claimed that at the media conference he had stated that the Microsoft funding amounted to 7%. "It now appears the final figure is about 8%, a statistically insignificant difference, and far less than the 20% figure Mr. Brinkley claimed in his article," said Theroux.

In June 2000, Wall Street Journal staff reporters Glenn Simpson and Ted Bridis revealed that Oracle had hired Investigative Group International, as well as Chlopak, Leonard, Schechter & Associates, a Washington, D.C., public-relations agency, to distribute damaging information about Microsoft's allies to media outlets. Oracle admitted that this was the "Microsoft adversary associated with the computer industry who refused to be further identified," which was the sole source for Brinkley's article.

References

External links
 
 EDIRC listing (provided by RePEc)
 Organizational Profile – National Center for Charitable Statistics (Urban Institute)
 Rating Profile – Charity Navigator
 Charity Profile – GuideStar

1986 establishments in California
Non-interventionism
Political and economic think tanks in the United States
Think tanks established in 1986
Libertarian organizations based in the United States
Libertarian think tanks